Karaçukur is a village in Anamur district of Mersin Province, Turkey. The population of the village is 604 as of 2011.

References

External links
Region Taşeli (for images)

Villages in Anamur District